The 2019 New York City FC season was the club's fifth season of competition and its fifth in the top tier of American soccer, Major League Soccer. New York City FC played its home games at Yankee Stadium in the New York City borough of The Bronx.

Club

Roster

Player movement

In 
Per Major League Soccer and club policies, terms of the deals do not get disclosed.

Out 

Per Major League Soccer and club policies, terms of the deals do not get disclosed.

Competitions

Exhibitions

Major League Soccer

Standings

Match results

NYCFC announced their 2019 season schedule on January 7, 2019.

Unless otherwise noted, all times in EDT

MLS Cup Playoffs

U.S. Open Cup 

As a member of MLS, NYCFC entered the competition at the fourth round, which was played on June 12, 2019.

Statistics

Appearances and goals
Last updated on 23 October 2019

|-
! colspan=14 style=background:#dcdcdc; text-align:center|Goalkeepers

|-
! colspan=14 style=background:#dcdcdc; text-align:center|Defenders

|-
! colspan=14 style=background:#dcdcdc; text-align:center|Midfielders

|-
! colspan=14 style=background:#dcdcdc; text-align:center|Forwards

|-
! colspan=14 style=background:#dcdcdc; text-align:center| Players who have made an appearance or had a squad number this season but have left the club

|-
|}

Notes

References

New York City FC seasons
New York City FC
New York City FC
New York City FC